The North Texas Food Bank (NTFB) is a social benefit organization located in Plano, Texas.  The organization distributes donated, purchased and prepared foods through a network of nearly 1,000 feeding programs and 400 Partner Agencies in 13 North Texas counties. The NTFB supports the nutritional needs of children, seniors, and families through education, advocacy and strategic partnerships.

History
The North Texas Food Bank was established in 1982 by Liz Minyard (prior owner of the Minyard's Food Stores chain), Kathryn Hall, Jo Curtis and Lorraine Griffin Kircher. Their goal was to address the critical issue of hunger in North Texas by securing donations of surplus unmarketable, but wholesome, foods and grocery products for distribution through a network of charitable organizations in 13 North Texas counties: Dallas, Denton, Collin, Fannin, Rockwall, Hunt, Grayson, Kaufman, Ellis, Navarro, Lamar, Delta and Hopkins. In the first year of operation, the Food Bank distributed 400,000 pounds of food.

Members of the North Texas Food Bank's organizing committee became advocates with members of the Texas Legislature for the passage of the Good Faith Donor Act, which protects donors from liability of donated product. With the passage of this act in 1983, many potential donors began actively donating.

The North Texas Food Bank is a certified member of Feeding America's Food Bank Network. Feeding America, the nation's largest domestic hunger relief organization, solicits food and grocery products from national suppliers for distribution through more than 200 certified Food Banks nationally. Feeding America also provides Food Banks with operational standards, training, support and inspection, and educates the public and government officials about the nature and solutions to the problem of hunger in the U.S. Based on distribution North Texas Food Bank is ranked 8th nationally among Feeding America food banks.

Since 1982, NTFB has distributed more than half a billion pounds of food.

Close the Gap (2008-2011)
Ending in June 2011, Close the Gap was the organization's three-year strategic plan to narrow the food gap by providing access to 50 million meals annually. By the end of their 2011 fiscal year (July 2010-June 2011), the organization provided access to 50.5 million meals; exceeding their goal.

ReThink Hunger (2011-2014)
Beginning in July 2011, NTFB began its three-year strategic plan, ReThink Hunger, to improve the services provided. The plan focused on three pillars: 
Healthier – Providing more nutritious food, including fresh produce. 
Smarter – Understanding hunger better through the development of The Hunger Center of North Texas, a collaborative research program that provides tools and information to fight hunger more efficiently. 
Stronger – Building capacity and collaborating more efficiently by investing in programs, facilities and partnerships that offer the best opportunities to improve service and efficiency.

In Fiscal Year 2014, the final year of the Rethink Hunger campaign, NTFB provided access to 62 million nutritious meals through a network of 262 Partner Agencies and 1000 feeding programs.

Stop Hunger, Build Hope Capital Campaign (2015-2018) 
In 2015, the North Texas Food Bank announced a 10-year plan to provide access to 92 million meals annually by 2025. The goal reflects the current need for food assistance in NTFB's 13-county service area and represents a nearly 50 percent increase in meals distributed today.

In February 2017, NTFB publicly launched the Stop Hunger Build Hope Capital Campaign to help fund a new Northern Distribution Center and other initiatives that will allow NTFB to reach the 92 million meal goal. In January 2018, the $55 million goal that would fund additional NTFB capacity, partner agency capacity and provide more insights about clients was achieved.

Operations
The North Texas Food Bank allocates all donations by using only 6% of all resources for fundraising and administrative costs which allows 94 cents of every dollar donated to reach the hungry. The organization focuses on providing more nutritious food to the community it serves, becoming a thought leader on the subject of hunger in North Texas and expanding its reach in North Texas. 
Both donated and purchased product are stored in their main warehouse location in Plano, the Perot Family Campus, which they moved into in September 2018.

North Texas Food Bank trucks pickup food donations from various locations. After being received and sorted by Food Bank volunteers and employees the food is then distributed to agencies throughout North Texas.

The North Texas Food Bank gathers donations of both perishable and nonperishable food as well as nonfood items. These items are then distributed to North Texas area food pantries, soup kitchens, homeless shelters and other programs that serve people in need.

An estimated 31,000 individuals volunteer their time at NTFB each year.

Board of Directors
Executive Committee
Anurag Jain, Access Healthcare (Chairman);
Michael Brookshire, Bain & Company;
Julia Buthman, Prudential Capital Group;
Tyler Cooper, Cooper Aerobics;
Calvin Hilton, Alliance Data;
Bill Hogg, Community Volunteer;
Cheryl Hughes, Toyota Motor North America, Inc.;
Ginny Kissling, Ryan, LLC;
Adam Saphier, Trammell Crow Co.;
Priya Sarjoo, Grant Thornton, LLP

Members at Large
John Beckert, Highlanders Partners;
Flauren Bender, The Greenway Shop;
Bobby Chestnut, Bank of America Merrill Lynch;
Jerri Garison, Baylor Scott & White;
Jeff George, Revival Healthcare Capital and Maytal, LLC;
James D. Jordan, Munsch Hardt Kopek & Harr, P.C.;
Retta Miller, Jackson Walker, LLP;
Mike Preston, FedEx Office;
Andrew Rosen, Kainos Capital, LP;
Todd Yoder, Fluor Corporation

Exofficio Members
Katherine Perot Reeves, Community Volunteer;
Emily Straten, Junior League of Dallas

General Counsel
Andy Zollinger, DLA Piper LLP (US)

Life Board Members
John Beckert, Highlander Partners;
Jerry Ellis, Community Volunteer;
Bette Perot, Perot Foundation;
Teresa Phillips, TPHD, LLC;
Stephan Pyles, Stephan Pyles Concepts

Founders
Jo Curtis;
Ambassador Kathryn Walt Hall;
Lorraine Griffin Kircher;
Liz Minyard

Mass Care Task Force
Hurricane Katrina brought over 30,000 evacuees to the North Texas area. Non-profit organizations in the North Texas area found that they were unable to meet the needs of those who migrated into the area. So in 2006, chief executive officers from the American Red Cross, the North Texas Food Bank, The Salvation Army and the Volunteer Center of North Texas formed the Mass Care Task Force; to prepare for disaster relief in the area. The task force is currently working on funding for the relief plan.

In 2011, when Hurricane Harvey hit the Gulf Coast, the Mass Care Task Force officially activated for the first time to provide food, shelter, and assistance to refugees from the area.

See also

 List of food banks

References

External links

Plano, Texas
Non-profit organizations based in Texas
Food banks in Texas